Strike Bautista Revilla (born Edwin Mortel Bautista; March 2, 1970) is a Filipino politician and incumbent Representative of Cavite's 2nd District in the Philippine House of Representatives. He is a member of the National Unity Party. He previously served as mayor of Bacoor and was a member of the board of directors of the Philippine Charity Sweepstakes Office (PCSO) from August 2005 to March 2007.

Background 
Born as Edwin Mortel Bautista, he is the 61st child of Jose Acuña Bautista (Ramon Bautista Revilla, Sr.) and the fifth child of Azucena Guzman Mortel Bautista. He is the younger brother of incumbent Senator Ramon "Bong" Revilla Jr. He finished his elementary education at Jesus Good Shepherd School in 1983 and attended high school at San Dimas High School in Los Angeles County, California from 1983 to 1987. He finished Commerce major in Management at Colegio de San Juan de Letran in Manila, where he also got his master's degree in Business Administration.

Prior to entering politics, Revilla managed various family businesses, including the Angelus Eternal Garden memorial park, which has branches in Bacoor and Imus, Cavite.

Political career 
At 25, Revilla was first elected as councilor of Bacoor in 1995. In 1998, he was elected to the Sangguniang Panlalawigan of Cavite where he served for two terms until 2004. He was appointed by President Gloria Macapagal Arroyo to the board of directors of the PCSO in 2005.

References

External links 
  Official Website of the City of Bacoor
  Balitang Strike! (Official Newsletter of the Office of the Mayor of Bacoor)

|-

1970 births
Colegio de San Juan de Letran alumni
Lakas–CMD politicians
Living people
Members of the House of Representatives of the Philippines from Cavite
Mayors of places in Cavite
Members of the Cavite Provincial Board
People from Bacoor
Strike
Mayors of Bacoor